The 2003 Island Games on Guernsey was the 2nd edition in which a women's football (soccer) tournament was played at the multi-games competition. It was contested by eight teams.

The Faroe Islands retained their title.

Participants

Group phase

Group A

Group B

Final stage

7th/8th place match

5th/6th place match

3rd/4th place match

Final

Final rankings

See also
Men's Football at the 2003 Island Games

External links
Official 2003 website

2003
Women
Island